Kathleen C. Taylor (born 1942) is a chemist who won the Garvan–Olin Medal in 1989, and is notable for developing catalytic converters for cars.

Education 
Taylor attended Douglass College at Rutgers University, earning a bachelor's in chemistry in 1964. She completed her Ph.D. in physical chemistry in 1968 at Northwestern University working with Robert Burwell, Jr. on the surface chemistry of catalysts. Following her Ph.D., she did postdoctoral research at the University of Edinburgh with Charles Kemball where she worked on the use of deuterium to track reactions on catalysts.

Career 
In 1970, Taylor joined General Motors where she is known for her work at General Motors on catalytic converters that helped reduce pollution from car exhaust, following work done earlier by Eugene Houdry. Taylor developed catalytic converters that converted nitric oxide into nitrogen, instead of ammonia, a toxin to humans. In 1987, while at General Motors, Taylor also served as president of the Materials Research Society.

When Taylor was elected a fellow of the National Academy of Engineering in 1995, she was cited "for the development of automotive-exhaust catalytic systems and leadership in materials battery and fuel cell research".

In a 2014 interview, Taylor described her work as an engineer and noted that she selected the field because she liked the challenge of engineering and the employment options that would available to her. As of 2017, she was retired from General Motors, but continued to consult at Columbia University and the United States Department of Energy on projects that reduce impacts on the environment.

Selected publications

Awards 
 1988 - Garvan Award from the American Chemical Society
 1994, Fellow, American Association for the Advancement of Science
 1995, National Academy of Engineering
 1997, Fellow, Society of Automotive Engineers
 2003, American Academy of Arts and Sciences
 2006, Indian National Academy of Engineering

Personal life 
Taylor is a painter who works in watercolors on scenes in Florida and Massachusetts.

References

American physical chemists
American women chemists
American automotive engineers
1942 births
Living people
Northwestern University alumni
Rutgers University alumni
General Motors people
Members of the United States National Academy of Engineering
American women artists
Fellows of the American Academy of Arts and Sciences
Fellows of the American Association for the Advancement of Science
21st-century American women